The local government areas (LGA) of New South Wales are the third tier of government in the Australian state. Under the Local Government Act 1993 (NSW) they can manage their own affairs to the extent permitted by the legislation. They may be designated as cities or otherwise as areas, though the latter units may choose to use titles that had distinctions under older forms of the act. The smallest local government by area in the state is the Municipality of Hunter's Hill  and the largest by area is Central Darling Shire Council . There are 129 local government areas in the state as of December 2022.

Local government authorities provide a wide range of services. The most important of these are the general services of administration, health, community amenities, recreation and culture, roads and debt servicing throughout the area controlled by the council. Councils also provide a range of trading activities, mainly in country areas of NSW. These trading activities include water supply, sewerage services, gas services and abattoir facilities.

Administered by the Government of New South Wales and subject to periodic restructuring involving voluntary and involuntary amalgamation of areas, local government areas are considered a city when an area has received city status by proclamation of the Governor. Some areas retain designations they held under prior legislation, even though these titles no longer indicate a legal status.  These may be towns, municipalities, regions, or shires. Many councils now choose not to use any area title, and simply refer to themselves as councils, e.g. Northern Beaches Council, Burwood Council.

History

Legislation
The formation of local government in New South Wales predates the formation of responsible government in the state. The Sydney Corporation was formed in 1842, an elected body to manage primary services such as street lighting and drainage. The Municipalities Act, 1858 introduced a system of local government. Municipalities were compulsorily incorporated by legislation in 1876, the third Municipalities Act, 1897 consolidated municipal law, and in 1905 the Local Government (Shires) Act 1905 was enacted to establish shires. The Local Government Act, 1906 reformed the municipal system, replaced by the Local Government Act, 1919, which lasted until the most recent 1993 Act.

The core principles of the 1993 legislative reforms were:
greater accountability by councils to their communities through better reporting, management plans, consultation on key issues, and access to information;
changes to the relationship between councillors and staff, whereby the elected council held all powers given under the Act, but could delegate most powers and appoint General Managers to have responsibility for “day-to-day” management, council staff and financial resources; and
a better distinction between service provision and regulatory activity was drawn. Maximum flexibility was given in respect to service provision, with some constraints, and accountability was increased. In regard to regulatory functions, proper attention had to be given to due process and procedural correctness.

Reviews of local government areas

The NSW Government has undertaken periodic reviews of local government since the early 1900s. Reforms included providing enfranchisement for women and for residents who did not own property in the LGA, standardising land valuation systems, and the introduction of ordinances.

1930s
The Greater Newcastle Act 1937 amalgamated 10 municipalities with the City of Newcastle to form Greater Newcastle.

1940s
In the post-war period, the Labor Party government of James McGirr, led by Joseph Cahill as Minister for Local Government, decided, following the recommendations of the 1945–46 Clancy Royal Commission on Local Government Boundaries, that Local Government reform would assist the process of improving state infrastructure and community facilities. This vision for a local government reform agenda, including large-scale amalgamations, was largely implemented in the Sydney basin through the Local Government (Areas) Act 1948.

1970s
The Barnett Committee Review of Local Government Areas, conducted during 1973-74, sought to create stronger economic LGAs through a substantial reduction in council numbers. The Barnett Report recommended the forced merging of the then 223 existing local government entities into 97 districts; a proposal that was initially rejected by the Askin–led coalition government. However, by 1980 and after several references to the NSW Local Government Boundaries Commission, the Wran-led Labor government amalgamated 38 councils into 17 entities.
 
The Bains Review of 1978 influenced the adoption of corporate management in councils whereby council affairs were dealt with as a whole and with co-ordinated forward planning, comprehensive distribution of resources and proper performance monitoring. Bains' review had major influence on the engagement of more powerful general managers, councillors becoming policy makers, and staff free from administrative councillor interference.

1980s
Completed by the NSW Local Government Boundaries Commission, this review focused on the efficiencies in the mergers of rural and regional councils and the anticipated economies of scale in service provision. The Local Government Areas Amalgamation Act 1980 saw the amalgamation of many municipalities with the shires that neighboured - and in some instances, surrounded - them.

1990s
The Carr-led Labor government initiated the Local Government Reform Task Force of 1995-97, the principal outcome of which was to promote resource sharing through the various regional organisations of councils. Triggered by a paper issued by the NSW Local Government and Shires Association, twenty-one councils reviewed their own position and explored three options including the status quo, models for resource sharing and a merger. However, only four councils entered into voluntary mergers in order to avoid potential forced amalgamations.

2000s
The Sproats Inquiry into the structure of local government in eight council areas of the Inner City and Eastern Suburbs of Sydney was commissioned by the state government in October 2000. Despite recommendations for mergers, with the Carr government maintaining a no-forced amalgamation policy, no mergers transpired until late 2008 when Sproats was invited to review his earlier paper, including revisiting the controversial proposal to amalgamate the City of Sydney Council with the South Sydney City Council.

The Carr government abandoned its policy of no forced mergers after the 2003 state election. Within a year, regional “super” councils were legislated for Inner Sydney, surrounding Canberra, Goulburn and Tamworth; four general purpose and two county councils were merged in Clarence Valley, as well as a number of other smaller-scale rural council amalgamations.

2010s
In October 2013, the NSW Government released the findings of an independent review of local government in New South Wales. The review findings, entitled Revitalising Local Government, examined historical and projected demographic data, financial sustainability, and other measures and projected the long-term viability of all local government bodies in the state. Included in the report were 65 recommendations to the government.

The government released its response to the review findings in September 2014 and then facilitated discussions with certain local government authorities with a view towards merger and/or amalgamation. In April 2015, the NSW Government referred the review findings and its responses to the NSW Independent Pricing and Regulatory Tribunal (IPART) to act as the Expert Advisory Panel and to review local council Fit for the Future proposals. Releasing its final report in October 2015, the IPART reviewed submissions from local government authorities and others with a view towards establishing authorities that have the scale and capacity to engage effectively across community, industry and government, are sustainable and efficient, and that effectively manage infrastructure and deliver services for local communities. The IPART found that:
 71 per cent of councils in metropolitan Sydney were 'not fit', primarily because councils did not propose a merger despite clear benefits; and
 56 per cent of councils in regional NSW were 'not fit', due to not proposing a merger despite clear benefits, ongoing deficits or both.

The IPART proposed a series of council mergers and amalgamation in both metropolitan and regional areas which proposed a reduction in the number of councils from 152 to 112. The NSW Government invited local government authorities to respond by 20 November 2015. Public response to the proposed amalgamations was mixed. Following consideration of the submissions, the Minister for Local Government referred merger proposals to the Chief Executive of the Office of Local Government (OLG) for examination and report under the Local Government Act. The OLG Chief Executive delegated the examination and reporting functions to Delegates who conducted public inquiries and invited further written submissions by 28 February 2016. On 12 May 2016, following a further review by the Minister for Local Government and the independent Local Government Boundaries Commission, Premier Mike Baird announced the creation of 19 new councils, through amalgamations and mergers, with immediate effect. The Minister indicated in principle support to create a further nine new councils, subject to the decision of the courts. On the same day, the Governor of New South Wales acted on the advice of the Minister, and proclaimed the 19 new local government areas.

On 9 May 2016, Strathfield Council challenged the proposed merger between Strathfield, Burwood and Canada Bay councils and commenced proceedings in the New South Wales Land and Environment Court. After the Court heard that there were legal flaws in the report from the State Government-appointed delegate who examined the proposal for merging the councils, on 31 May, the NSW Government withdrew from the case and the merger proposal stalled. Mosman, Hunters Hill, North Sydney, Ku-ring-gai, Woollahra, Oberon and Walcha councils also challenged the Government's amalgamations. The proclamation of the new Bayside Council occurred on 9 September 2016, following the conclusion of legal action by Botany Bay City Council in the Court of Appeal.
In December, the NSW Court of Appeal unanimously dismissed Woollahra Council's appeal, finding no merit in its arguments that the proposed merger with its neighbouring councils was invalid. In July 2017, the Berejiklian government decided to abandon the forced merger of the Sydney local government areas, following an earlier move to abandon proposed forced mergers in rural and regional NSW.

2021 iVote failures
During the 2021 NSW Local Government Elections the online voting system "iVote" had technical issues that caused some access problems for some voters. Analysis done of these failures indicated a significant chance of having impacted on the electoral results for the final councillors. In Kempsey, where the margin between the last elected and first non-elected candidate was only 69 votes, the electoral commission determined that the outage caused a 60% chance that the wrong final candidate was elected, Singleton was a 40% chance the wrong councillor, Shellharbour was a 7% chance and two other races impacted by a potential sub-1% chance of having elected the wrong candidate. The NSW Supreme Court ordered the elections Kempsey, Singleton and Shellharbour Ward A. In the 2022 Kempsey re-vote the highest placed non-elected candidate from 2021, Dean Saul, was instead one the first councillors elected. This failure caused the NSW Government to suspend the iVote system from use in the 2023 New South Wales state election.

See also 

Local government in Australia
Local government areas of New South Wales
Counties of New South Wales

References

External links 

New South Wales

Local Government Areas